In Greek mythology, Agelus (Ancient Greek: Ἄγελόν) was the son of Poseidon and an unnamed nymph of Chios. He was the brother of Melas and Malina.

Note

References 

 Pausanias, Description of Greece with an English Translation by W.H.S. Jones, Litt.D., and H.A. Ormerod, M.A., in 4 Volumes. Cambridge, MA, Harvard University Press; London, William Heinemann Ltd. 1918. . Online version at the Perseus Digital Library
 Pausanias, Graeciae Descriptio. 3 vols. Leipzig, Teubner. 1903.  Greek text available at the Perseus Digital Library.

Children of Poseidon
Demigods in classical mythology